Miloslav Mečíř and Milan Šrejber were the defending champions, but neither of them competed that year.Leonardo Lavalle and Jorge Lozano won the title, defeating Diego Nargiso and Nicolas Pereira 6-3, 7–6 in the final.

Seeds

  John Fitzgerald /  Anders Järryd (quarterfinals)
  Tim Pawsat /  Laurie Warder (first round)
  Eric Jelen /  Tomáš Šmíd (quarterfinals)
  Patrick Galbraith /  David Macpherson (quarterfinals)

Draw

Draw

References
General

Doubles
1990 ATP Tour